Gjiten (pronounced goo-jee-ten) is a free software dictionary application developed for Linux operating systems, using the GNOME development libraries. It functions primarily as a Japanese–English dictionary tool meant to search EDICT dictionary files, but it has other features such as hand-drawn kanji recognition. It was first published on December 25, 1999. Its current release is v2.6, available since October 28, 2006. The source code is downloadable from the developers' website.

Function
Gjiten has a graphical user interface, with most of the search options and parameters readily shown in the toolbar. The window serves as a frontend for dictionary lookup actions, able to look up words based on hiragana, katakana, kanji or English. It requires the user to define UTF8 dictionary files for use, otherwise it will not work. The EDICT and KanjiDIC dictionaries are installed by default. A further requirement is a Japanese Input method and fontset, like im-ja, kinput2 or anthy.

Main features
 Multiple dictionary search (extensions)
 Extensive kanji information on a single click (Kanjidic)
 Kanji search based on stroke counts, radicals or search keys
 Handwritten kanji recognition (requires Kanjipad installation)
 English and Japanese menus
 All important search parameters
 Beginning with.../End with... etc.
 Search result limiter
 Customizable font/font size

See also

 Kiten (program) – similar application for the KDE Desktop environment
 JWPce – free software word-processor/dictionary bundle.

References

External links
 Japanese dictionary for GNOME download | SourceForge.net - sourceforge repository for Gjiten. Contains a release and license.
 Gjiten website – developer's website in English and Japanese. DEB and RPM packages available
 Debian Package Repository – older and up-to-date *.deb packages for use with Debian or compatible Linux systems.

Dictionary software that uses GTK
GNOME Applications
Japanese dictionaries
Japanese language learning resources